Zdzisław Aleksander Mamert Suchodolski (May 11, 1835 – February 2, 1908) was a German-Polish painter.

Biography
His father January Suchodolski was the painter and army officer.

After studying in Krakow, he went to the Kunstakademie Düsseldorf and the Düsseldorf school of painting in Düsseldorf.

From 1874 to 1880 he worked in Weimar; from 1880 he lived in Munich.

His work is included in the collection of the District Museum of Suwalki, Poland.

References

Further reading
 Zdzisław Aleksander Mamert Suchodolski h. Ślepowron (ID: le.3584.1.9)

1835 births
1908 deaths
19th-century German painters
19th-century German male artists
19th-century Polish painters
20th-century German painters
20th-century Polish male artists
20th-century Polish painters
Kunstakademie Düsseldorf alumni
Düsseldorf school of painting